Case Unclosed is a Philippine television documentary show broadcast by GMA Network. Originally hosted by Kara David, it premiered on October 2, 2008, replacing 100% Pinoy!. Arnold Clavio served as the final host. The show concluded on February 25, 2010, with a total of 70 episodes. It was replaced by Kandidato in its timeslot.

Premise
Case Unclosed featured some of the most sensational cases in the Philippines that were unsolved by the authorities until now. The episodes were directed by award-winning Filipino independent film directors. The program also aired on GMA News TV's Channel 11.

Hosts

Episodes

Accolades

References

External links
 

2008 Philippine television series debuts
2010 Philippine television series endings
Filipino-language television shows
GMA Network original programming
GMA Integrated News and Public Affairs shows
Philippine documentary television series